Menterap is a Malayic language of Borneo.

References

Malayic languages
Languages of Indonesia